Suchart (from Pali/Sanskrit  'good' +  'birth') is a masculine given name of Thai origin.

List of people with the given name 

 Suchart Chaivichit (born 1956), Thai chess player
 Suchart Chomklin (born 1974), Thai politician
 Suchart Chaovisith (1940–2009), Thai politician
 Suchart Jairsuraparp (born 1951), Thai former sprinter
 Suchart Mutugun (born 1934), Thai former footballer
 Suchart Pichi (born 1979), Thai diver
 Suchart Prommai, Thai major general
 Suchart Sawatsi (born 1945), Thai editor and writer
 Suchart Tancharoen (born 1958), Thai politician
 Suchart Thada-Thamrongvech (born 1952), Thai politician and professor

See also 

 Sachat, village in Kazakhstan

Masculine given names
Thai masculine given names